DOWN is a location-based social networking and online dating application for users looking for casual relationships and hookups. Users can swipe up for more serious dating, swipe down for casual hookups, or left to pass and continue to the next profile. DOWN bills itself as a open-minded, sex-positive alternative to other dating apps.

Founded in 2013 as Bang with Friends, the app began as a Facebook web app for curious singles to find which of their Facebook friends were interested in "banging," or casual sex. After lawsuits from Zynga, the developer of popular games like Words with Friends, Bang with Friends changed its name to DOWN in late 2013.

History

Bang With Friends
Bang with Friends was launched by Colin Hodge and Omri Mor after meeting at Boost VC, a venture capital tech incubator in San Mateo, California. After working on HeardAboutYou, an app billed as Linkedin for lovers, Hodge looked for a way to simplify the online dating process for users who were looking for something casual.

In just the first few weeks after launch in January 2013, Bang with Friends picked up coverage first from the niche entertainment site, BroBible, and then went viral with stories in BuzzFeed, the Daily Mail, The Daily Beast, and even the Colbert Report. News coverage and online discussion often highlighted the provocative and humorous marketing from the viral app company.

For the first few months, the startup continued to spark discussion and attention from the press, keeping their identities anonymous. While there was speculation about the identity of the founders, they granted interviews anonymously, identifying only as "C" or other letters. After founder Colin Hodge's identity was revealed in promotional material for New York's 2013 Internet Week, Gawker landed Hodge's first public interview.

In the first year, Bang With Friends raised $1 million from investors, including Boost VC, Tim Draper, and Great Oaks Venture Capital.

Bang With Friends reached 1 million users within three months of launch. With the surge of registrations and press attention, the Bang With Friends app gained even more headlines with a guerilla marketing campaign at the March, 2013 South by Southwest Festival. The company launched a SXSW-specific hookup website, "Bang with SXSW", and plastered the festival's walls with raunchy advertisements. SXSW organizers tore the posters down, drawing more press coverage and fueling the controversy.

Starting as a simple Facebook web app in January 2013, the mobile app version of DOWN launched on the Apple App Store and Google Play Store in May 2013. Within weeks, the app was suddenly removed by Apple from the App Store. By August 2013, the app was back up under its new rebranded name, "DOWN".

Lawsuits and rebrand
Midway through 2013, Bang With Friends was sued by Zynga, the social network game maker who owned Words With Friends. Zynga claimed the trademark rights to the phrase "With Friends," threatening a lawsuit against Bang With Friends. The companies decided to settle out of court under undisclosed terms and Bang with Friends rebranded to DOWN in late 2013. The new name of the company is a reference to the casual American slang definition of "down," as used in the phrases "down to fuck" or to "get down," and was Hodge's way of moving the company away from "alienating people who may not want an app that says "bang" but are totally down otherwise."

Along with the rebrand, they updated the dating app to remove the limit on connecting with Facebook friends and expanded users' reach to friends-of-friends. DOWN then further expanded to location-based dating. This allowed users to connect with strangers nearby for a date or "get down" for something casual.

At SXSW in 2014, DOWN co-founder & CEO Colin Hodge returned, this time invited, and headlined a discussion with Grindr founder and CEO Joel Simkhai titled "SXSW: From Stranger to Lover in One Swipe." The pair discussed the impact of social technology, the evolution of mobile dating, and how creating apps like Grindr and DOWN changed their own dating lives.

Sales and growth as DOWN
In 2016, after organically growing to 5 million users, DOWN was acquired by a Singaporean tech company named Paktor. During 2017, DOWN disclosed it made $1 million in annual revenue from in-app purchases. As part of Paktor, DOWN eventually was rolled into M17 Entertainment in the merger between Paktor and 17LIVE, one of the world's top livestreaming companies.

In 2018, the company was sold by M17 Entertainment, reverting ownership of the company to Hodge and an original team member.

In 2021, both revenue and the number of users rose over 100% for DOWN, a top 20 dating app the Apple App Store and the Google Play Store in the United States as of October 2021. The app claims over 8 million users worldwide.

Operation
DOWN's navigation differs from the typical right or left swipe-binary commonly used by other dating apps. Instead, users can swipe up for serious dating, swipe down for casual hookups, or swipe left to pass on and continue to the next profile. You can also swipe right to view previously seen profiles, so users can revise their choices, a feature not common in other dating apps.

DOWN is available on both the App Store and Google Play, with ratings above 4.0 on both platforms. Users can register or sign in with Apple or Google Login, Phone number login via SMS, or Facebook.

Features
The app's premium subscription allows users access to features like the ability to view which users viewed your profile, the ability to change your location to anywhere in the world, unlimited profile views, a "flirt" feature where users can directly message prospective partners before a match, and the ability to see when your match has read your message.

In April 2021, DOWN launched Snap Match, a quick matching feature, that allows users to find virtual connections almost instantly, around the world.

References

External links
 Official website
 DOWN dating blog

Computer-related introductions in 2013
Geosocial networking
Mobile social software
Online dating services of the United States
Proprietary cross-platform software
Online dating applications
iOS software
Android (operating system) software
Software companies established in 2013